KVNU (610 AM) is a broadcast radio station in the United States. Licensed to Logan, Utah, KVNU is owned by the Cache Valley Media Group and has a news/talk format serving the Logan metropolitan area. The station first signed on in 1938 and was owned by the family of Herschel Bullen until 1996.

History
The Cache Valley Broadcasting Company, led by S.L. Billings and other Salt Lake City entrepreneurs, founded KVNU in 1938, and the station first broadcast on November 20 that year. Shortly afterwards, Herschel Bullen and his son Reed became stockholders of KVNU's parent company. By 1945, the Bullens had become majority owners of the Cache Valley Broadcasting Company, with Herschel leading the company and Reed moving up from station general manager to company general manager to company director.  Reed hosted Man on the Street, a daily 12:15 p.m. live broadcast from a local jewelry business soliciting opinions from members of the public.

In 1986, Reed Bullen retired as KVNU director and transferred the station to his son Jonathan. Then in 1996, the Bullen family soold KVNU to the Cache Valley Media Group.

Programming
Long branded as "The Voice of Northern Utah", KVNU has local talk shows on weekday morning (6 to 10 a.m.) and afternoon (4 to 6 p.m.) drive time slots. The rest of the weekday schedule consists of nationally syndicated programming, including Premiere Networks' The Clay Travis and Buck Sexton Show and The Sean Hannity Show, The Ramsey Show, and Westwood One's The Jim Bohannon Show.

KVNU is also part of the ABC News Radio network, with hourly news updates from ABC in addition to the weekly newsmagazine Perspective.

Sports
As early as 1948, KVNU broadcast Utah Agricultural College (later Utah State University) football games. KVNU continued broadcasting Utah State football and eventually men's basketball through the 2016–17 season. In May 2017, Utah State discontinued its partnership with KVNU and changed its flagship station to KZNS in Salt Lake City.

KVNU has also broadcast Logan High School football since the 1940s.

Translator
In addition to the main station, KVNU is relayed by a translator on the FM band to widen its broadcast area.

Notes

External links

KVNU's "For the People" blog

Mass media in Salt Lake City
VNU
Radio stations established in 1938